Child in the Night is a 1990 American television film broadcast during the 1990 May sweeps. It aired on the CBS Network before a subsequent release to home video and syndication. The psychological thriller stars JoBeth Williams as a child psychologist, Tom Skerritt as a local police chief and introduced Elijah Wood as a troubled witness to a brutal slaying. Darren McGavin co-starred.

It was the final film on-screen role appearance of Rick May, who died 30 years later on April 8, 2020.

Plot
In Seattle, nine-year-old Luke Winfield (Elijah Wood) is the only witness to his father's murder at the hands of a rain-slicker-wearing killer with a cargo hook. However, the boy fantasizes the murderer as Captain Hook, in an escape from the traumatic reality. Detective T. Bass (Tom Skerritt), who is in charge of the investigation enlists child psychologist, Dr. Hollis (JoBeth Williams) whose failed marriage was caused by her inability to have children. While getting closer to Luke she has an affair with Bass. She also discovers some troubling family secrets ensuring she is next to be slain.

Cast

Production 
JoBeth Williams chose to perform in the film due to the romance subplot between her character and Tom Kerritt's, as she found filming it fun. Child in the Night also marks Elijah Wood's first role.

Release 
Child in the Night aired on CBS on May 1, 1990. The film received a VHS release in the 1990s through Triboro and in 2021 was released as part of a box set of made-for-TV movies entitled Televised Terror: Volume One, through Vinegar Syndrome.

Reception
Critical reception was negative and the Honolulu Advertiser wrote "A condemnation of 1980s greed or an overblown two-hour sitcom without the laugh track? You decide." Kay Gardella of the Daily News panned Child in the Night, as she felt that it lacked credibility. A syndicated reviewer for the United Feature Syndicate was similarly dismissive, stating that partway through it "becomes just another whodunit with the standard woman-in-jeopardy climax."

Horror Society reviewed the film as part of the Televised Terror: Volume One box set, stating that it was the weakest of the set but that it was also "a well put together murder mystery."

References

External links

 

1990 films
1990 television films
1990s mystery films
1990s psychological thriller films
American thriller television films
Films scored by Mark Snow
Films about dysfunctional families
Films shot in Washington (state)
CBS network films
Films directed by Mike Robe
1990s English-language films
1990s American films